Technische Hochschule Lübeck (THL) is a technical university of applied sciences located in the hanseatic city of Lübeck in northern Germany. The university was renamed in 2018 and was formerly known as “Fachhochschule Lübeck (FHL)” respectively "Lübeck University of Applied Sciences”. There are 35 degree programs, with 21 Bachelor's degree programs and 14 Master's degree programs. 5,164 students are studying at the university, including 1,655 women (as of Winter Semester 2020–21).

International collaborations
The university's electrical engineering program has had an exchange program with  Milwaukee School of Engineering (MSOE) since 1995. There are international partnerships in industrial and mechanical engineering. Recently, it has worked with MSOE to develop a MIS exchange program. It also collaborates and has exchange programs with other universities in the United States, as well as with universities in China, Denmark, Finland, France, Ghana, Ireland, Latvia, Spain, and Sweden. Currently there are also more than 70 Exchange Students from East China University of Science and Technology, Shanghai participating in Environmental Engineering and Electrical Engineering. Further, 5 to 7 students qualify themselves to enroll IFIM Business School, Bangalore, India, and 6 to 8 students of the counterpart school come as a part of yearly exchange program.

One University - Four Departments

The departments, their degree programs and the respective teaching language (if available)

Department of Applied Natural Sciences 
 Applied Chemistry, B.Sc. (German)
 Biomedical Engineering, M.Sc. (English)
Biomedical Engineering, B.Sc. (German)
Medical Microtechnology, M.Sc. (Englisch)
 Audiological Acoustics, B.Sc. (German)
Auditory Technology, M.Sc. (German)
Physical Technology, B.Sc. (German)
Regulatory Affairs, M.Sc. (German)
Technical Biochemistry, M.Sc. (German)
Environmental Engineering and - Management, B.Sc. (German)

Department of Architecture and Civil Engineering 
 Architecture, B.A. and M.A. (German)
 Civil Engineering, B. Eng. and M.Eng. (German)
 Urban Planning, B.Sc. (German)
Urban Design and Planning, M.A. (German)
Sustainable Building Technology, B.Eng. (German)
Water Engineering, M.Eng. (English)

Department of Electrical Engineering and Computer Science 
 Applied Information Technology, M.Sc.  (English/German)
 Electrical Engineering - 
General Electrical Engineering, B.Sc.
Energy Systems and Automation Eng., B.Sc.
Communication Systems, B.Sc.
 Computer Science/Software Engineering
Computer Science/Software Engineering for Distributed Systems, M.Sc.
Information Technology and Design, B.Sc.
IT Security Online, B.Sc.
Computer Science and Media Applications - online studies, B.Sc./M.Sc.
Renewable Energies Online, B.Sc.

Department of Mechanical Engineering and Business Administration 
 Business Administration, B.Sc.* and M.A.
Mechanical Engineering,  B.Sc. (incl. dual studies Mechanical Engineering)
Mechanical Engineering, M.Sc. (English)
Business Administration and Engineering, B.Sc. and M.Sc.
Business Administration and Engineering (online), B.Eng.
Business Administration and Engineering – Food Industry, B.Eng.

References

External links
 University homepage (in German)
LinkedIn Page of the University
Much of the content of this article comes from the equivalent German-language Wikipedia article (retrieved September 23, 2006).

 
Engineering universities and colleges in Germany
Buildings and structures in Lübeck
Universities and colleges in Schleswig-Holstein
Universities of Applied Sciences in Germany